Gábor Fejes (born 25 May 1989) is a Hungarian racing cyclist. He rode at the 2014 UCI Road World Championships.

Major results

2008
 1st  Time trial, National Under-23 Road Championships
2009
 National Under-23 Road Championships
1st  Time trial
2nd Road race
2010
 1st  Time trial, National Under-23 Road Championships
2011
 1st  Time trial, National Road Championships
 1st Stage 1 Tour of Pécs
 7th Memorial Davide Fardelli
2012
 National Road Championships
1st  Time trial
2nd Road race
 7th Overall Tour de Serbie
2013
 1st  Time trial, National Road Championships
2014
 National Road Championships
1st  Time trial
5th Road race
2016
 5th Time trial, National Road Championships
2017
 4th Time trial, National Road Championships
2018
 2nd Time trial, National Road Championships
2020
 3rd Road race, National Road Championships

References

External links

1989 births
Living people
Hungarian male cyclists
Place of birth missing (living people)